The women's singles competition of the table tennis event at the 2015 Southeast Asian Games was held from 2 to 4 June at the Singapore Indoor Stadium in Singapore.

Schedule

Results

Preliminary round

Group A

Group B

Group C

Group D

Knockout round

Semifinals

Gold medal match

References

External links
 

Women's singles
Women's sports competitions in Singapore
South